André Carbonnelle (3 January 1923 – 30 November 2015) was a Belgian field hockey player. He competed at the 1956 Summer Olympics and the 1960 Summer Olympics.

References

External links
 

1923 births
2015 deaths
Belgian male field hockey players
Olympic field hockey players of Belgium
Field hockey players at the 1956 Summer Olympics
Field hockey players at the 1960 Summer Olympics
Sportspeople from Tournai